Johanna Hall (24 May 1934 – 9 February 1996) was a British equestrian. She competed at the 1960 Summer Olympics, the 1964 Summer Olympics and the 1968 Summer Olympics.

In the 1950s she went on holiday to Austria and received lessons in the famous Vienna riding school. During these lessons she become closely acquainted with a young British man, Robert Hall (1924-2014). She joined him in England where he ran the Fulmer School of Equitation in Gerrards Cross, Buckinghamshire. They married in 1958. They had a son in 1966 and lived in The White House in Fulmer, Buckinghamshire.

Just before the Rome Olympics Hall competed in Ascot and her win impressed the GB selectors so enormously that they asked her to compete for GB in the Olympics in Rome. Her nationality papers had to be quickly sorted out.

She won the GB Championship in 1962, and went on to compete in Tokyo in 1964 and is the first foreigner and British rider to win the prestigious Hamburg Dressage Derby in 1965.

References

External links
 

1934 births
1996 deaths
British female equestrians
British dressage riders
Olympic equestrians of Great Britain
Equestrians at the 1960 Summer Olympics
Equestrians at the 1964 Summer Olympics
Equestrians at the 1968 Summer Olympics
Sportspeople from Rotterdam